Rectilinear means related to a straight line; it may refer to:

 Rectilinear grid, a tessellation of the Euclidean plane 
 Rectilinear lens, a photographic lens
 Rectilinear locomotion, a form of animal locomotion
 Rectilinear polygon, a polygon whose edges meet at right angles
 Rectilinear propagation, a property of waves
 Rectilinear Research Corporation, a now defunct manufacturer of high-end loudspeakers
 Rectilinear style, the third historical division of English Gothic architecture
 Rectilinear motion or linear motion is motion along a straight line
 Rectilinear prophecy, where a straight line can be drawn from the prophecy to the fulfillment without any branches as in the case of typological interpretations
 Near-rectilinear halo orbit, a highly-elliptical orbit around a Lagrangian point of a moon, that due to the moons orbital movement, will be nearly rectilinear in some frames of reference.

See also
 Linear (disambiguation)
 Straight (disambiguation)